A general election was held in the U.S. state of Vermont on November 4, 2014. All of Vermont's executive officers were up for election as well as Vermont's at-large seat in the United States House of Representatives. Primary elections were held on June 3, 2014.

Governor

Lieutenant Governor

Incumbent Republican Lieutenant Governor Phil Scott (since 2011) ran again for a third term.

Republican primary
Incumbent Phil Scott was unopposed in the Republican primary.

Results

Democratic primary

Candidates

Withdrew
John Bauer

Results

Progressive primary
Dean Corren, former State Representative (1991-2001), House campaign coordinator for U.S. Rep. Bernie Sanders (2001-2005), renewable electric utility officer at Burlington Electric Department and Verdant Power Inc., ran unopposed in the Progressive primary.

Results

Liberty Union primary
Marina Brown, activist, ran unopposed in the Liberty Union primary.

Results

General election

Candidates
Marina Brown (LU)
Dean Corren (P)
Phil Scott (R)

Results

Secretary of State

Incumbent Democratic Secretary of State Jim Condos (since 2011) ran again for a third term.

Democratic primary

Republican primary

Progressive primary

Liberty Union primary

General election

Candidates
Jim Condos (D)
Ben Eastwood (P)
Mary Alice Herbert (LU)

Results

Treasurer
Incumbent Democratic/Republican Treasurer Beth Pearce (since 2011) ran again for a third term.

Democratic primary

Republican primary

Progressive primary

Liberty Union primary

General election

Candidates
Murray Ngoima (LU)
Beth Pearce (D/R)
Don Schramm (P)

Results

Attorney General
Incumbent Attorney General William Sorrell (since 1997) ran again for a tenth term.

Democratic primary

Republican primary

Progressive primary

Liberty Union primary

General election

Candidates
Rosemarie Jackowski (LU)
Shane McCormack (R)
William Sorrell (D)

Results

Auditor of Accounts
Incumbent Democratic/Progressive Auditor Doug Hoffer (since 2013) ran again for a second term.

Democratic primary

Republican primary

Progressive primary

Liberty Union primary

General election

Candidates
Doug Hoffer (D/P)

Results

References

 
Vermont